Sahebpur Kamal (Balia) Assembly constituency is an assembly constituency in Begusarai district in the Indian state of Bihar.

Overview
As per Delimitation of Parliamentary and Assembly constituencies Order, 2008, No. 145 Sahebpur Kamal Assembly constituency is composed of the following: Sahebpur Kamal and Ballia community development blocks.

Sahebpur Kamal Assembly constituency is part of No. 24 Begusarai (Lok Sabha constituency).
As a consequence of the orders of the Delimitation Commission of India, Balia Assembly constituency ceased to exist in 2010.

Members of Legislative Assembly (MLA)

Election results

2020 

9.09%

2015

References

External links
 

Assembly constituencies of Bihar
Politics of Begusarai district